Old Mill High School is a public high school in Millersville, Maryland, serving students in grades 9 through 12. It was occupied in 1975 and is administered by Anne Arundel County Public Schools (AACPS). The school was built to alleviate overcrowding at Arundel and Severna Park High Schools. The school has no walls or ceilings in some classrooms, only partitions to separate classrooms. Along with Annapolis High School and Meade Senior High School, Old Mill Senior High is one of the three IB World Schools in Anne Arundel County. The school building also houses the high school's two feeder schools, Old Mill Middle School North and Old Mill Middle School South.  The school mascot is the patriot.

Students

The Old Mill feeder system/cluster is the most geographically expansive cluster in the Anne Arundel County Public Schools district. The feeder covers areas as far south as Crownsville and Annapolis and as far north as Glen Burnie and Severn. The Old Mill feeder system also covers portions of the Millersville, Gambrills, and Odenton as well. As such, Old Mill High School is one of the most racially and socio-economically diverse high schools in Anne Arundel County—the second most diverse public high school in Anne Arundel County, according to Niche. As of the 2019-2020 school year, the racial composition of the 2,281 Old Mill High School students was 39.1% white, 36% Black or African American, 13.6% Hispanic, 4.6% Asian, and 6.1% two or more races. Further, 34.6% of students qualified for free and reduced price meals, and approximately 3% of students are English Language Learners. The Old Mill cluster is bordered by the Meade cluster to the northwest, the Arundel and Crofton clusters to the midwest, the South River and Annapolis clusters to the southwest, the Severna Park cluster to the south, the Glen Burnie and North County clusters to the north, and the Glen Burnie and Chesapeake clusters to the east. Thus, Old Mill High School's attendance boundaries share a border with all but three of the 12 other high schools in the Anne Arundel County Public Schools district.

Academics
Old Mill High School is a public magnet school. It has 2,364 students in grades 9-12 with a student-teacher ratio of 16 to 1. According to state test scores, 92% of students are at least proficient in math and 91% in reading.

Since 1977, Old Mill has been accredited by the Commission on Secondary Schools of the Middle States Association. Newsweek magazine also ranked Old Mill in their 2007 Top 1300 Public High Schools in the Country List, at number 773.

U.S. News & World Report ranked Old Mill High School as the 36th best high school in Maryland in 2015.

Old Mill High School ranks 106th out of 170 schools in Maryland on School Digger.

In addition to offering its IB magnet program, Old Mill also offers 24 AP classes, exceeding the state average of 18.

International Baccalaureate (IB)
Old Mill High School has been an IB World School since April 2005. It offers the IB Diploma Programme, preceded by the Extended Learning Program (ELP), or more commonly known as Pre-IB. The school offers a variety of standard level (SL) and higher level (HL) courses. The IB program is coordinated in Old Mill by Mrs. Sutherin and Mrs. Romanoski, and Ms. Klimes is the guidance counselor for all the IB students.

Old Mill High School is currently an IB Middle Years Programme candidate school, with the intention being that Old Mill will be 'whole-school' International Baccalaureate eventually. This is in conjunction with the two other IB World Schools currently in place in Anne Arundel County, Annapolis High School and Meade High School.

Other programs
AVID
ESOL

Extracurricular activities
Students at Old Mill Senior High School are encouraged to participate in extracurricular, community, social and professional development organizations including:

Student Government Association
Band
Chess Club
Chorus
Dance Company
FBLA
FHA
FLES/FLEX
Foreign Language Club
Freshman Scholars
Gay-Straight Alliance
International Thespian Society
International ESOL Club
It's Academic
Junior Statesmen of America
Key Club
Ladies of Excellence
Literary Magazine (Illuminations)
Marching Band
Math Club
Mathematics Engineering and Science Achievement
Mock Trial
Model United Nations
Modern Music Masters Honor Society (Tri-M)
Music Program (including color guard flags, concert band, jazz band, marching band, orchestra and stage band)
Musical Production
National Art Honor Society
National Honor Society
National Science Honor Society
National French Honor Society
National Spanish Honor Society
S.W.A.N. Club
Newspaper (The Patriot Echo)
Patriots Achieving Total Success
Patriot Players Theatre Company (PPTC)
People for Animal Welfare
Photography Club
Junior Statesmen of America
TSA (Technology Student Association)
Pom Squad
Renaissance
Robotics Club
Salsa Club
Sailing Club
Shutter Society
Steel Drum Band
Video Game Production Club

Athletics

The Old Mill Patriots participate in a variety of interscholastic sports and activities, including:

Fall
Cheerleading
Cross Country Running
Field Hockey
Football - 2009 Maryland 4A State Champions, 2011 Maryland 4A State Champions
Golf
Soccer
Volleyball
Winter
Basketball
Bowling
Cheerleading
Indoor Track and Field
Wrestling 9x 3A/4A Maryland State Tournament Champions. 3x 3A/4A Maryland State Dual Champions. Former Coach Mike Hampe in the National Wrestling Hall of Fame.
Swimming
Tennis
Spring
Baseball - 4X State Champion (1980, 1989, 2003, 2019)
Gymnastics
Lacrosse
Softball
Outdoor Track and Field

Notable alumni

 Kevin Barnes (2004), American football player
 Josh Hader (2012), baseball
 Jeong H. Kim (1979), founded Yurie Systems, president of Bell Labs
 Nick Kisner (2009), professional boxer
 James E. Rzepkowski (1989), former member of Maryland House of Delegates
 Lester Speight (1981), American football player, professional wrestler and actor

School staph infections
In October 2007, Old Mill High School was listed as one of four high schools in Anne Arundel County that had outbreaks of staph infections.  28 cases of the infection have also been reported at Severna Park High School, Glen Burnie High School, and Chesapeake High School.

References

External links
 Website maintained by the school
 AACPS webpage for Old Mill High

Public high schools in Maryland
International Baccalaureate schools in Maryland
Educational institutions established in 1975
Schools in Anne Arundel County, Maryland
1975 establishments in Maryland